Sardar Harnarain Singh was an Indian army personnel who held the rank of a major general in the Indian Armed Forces. He was the head of the Rajput Regiment in early 1950s and served as the Military Secretary to Rajendra Prasad, the first President of India, who accompanied the President in his official visits. The Government of India awarded him the third highest civilian honour of the Padma Bhushan, in 1963, for his contributions to Indian Armed Forces.

See also 

 Rajendra Prasad

References 

Recipients of the Padma Bhushan in civil service
Indian Army personnel
Year of birth missing
Year of death missing